Brownson is a surname. Notable people with the surname include:

Callie Brownson (born 1989), American football coach
Carleton Lewis Brownson (1866–1948), American educator 
Charles B. Brownson (1914-1988), American politician
Derry Brownson (born 1970), English musician
Deborah Brownson (born 1974), British autism campaigner
James I. Brownson (1817–1899), American clergyman and academic
John W. Brownson (New York politician) (1807-1860), American politician
John W. Brownson (Wisconsin politician), (1842-?), American politician
Mark Brownson (1975-2017),  American  baseball player
Nathan Brownson (1742–1796), American physician and politician
Oliver Brownson (1746–1815), American composer and publisher
Orestes Brownson (1803–1876), American philosopher and writer
Sarah Brownson  (1839–1876), American writer
Willard H. Brownson (1845–1935), American naval admiral

See also
Brownson Islands, outside the entrance to Cranton Bay
USS Brownson (DD-518), aFletcher-class destroyer, launched in 1942 and sunk in action 1943
USS Brownson (DD-868), a Gearing-class destroyer, launched in 1945 and struck in 1976